In statistics and computational geometry, the Tukey depth  is a measure of the depth of a point in a fixed set of points. The concept is named after its inventor, John Tukey. Given a set of n points  in d-dimensional space, Tukey's depth of a point x is the smallest fraction (or number) of points in any closed halfspace that contains x.

Tukey's depth measures how extreme a point is with respect to a point cloud. It is used to define the bagplot, a bivariate generalization of the boxplot.

For example, for any extreme point of the convex hull there is always a (closed) halfspace that contains only that point, and hence its Tukey depth as a fraction is 1/n.

Definitions 

Sample Tukey's depth of point x, or Tukey's depth of x with respect to the point cloud , is defined as 

where  is the indicator function that equals 1 if its argument holds true or 0 otherwise.

Population Tukey's depth of x wrt to a distribution  is

where X is a random variable following distribution .

Tukey mean and relation to centerpoint 

A centerpoint c of a point set of size n is nothing else but a point of Tukey depth of at least n/(d + 1).

See also 

 Centerpoint (geometry)

References

Computational geometry